Bucephalandra oncophora is a species of flowering plant in the family Araceae, native to Kalimantan on Borneo. It is an obligate rheophyte, found on pentlandite (an iron–nickel sulfide mineral) alongside streams.

References

Aroideae
Endemic flora of Borneo
Plants described in 2014